A person who carries (to carry) something is a carrier.

Carrier may refer to:

Entertainment
 Carrier (album), a 2013 album by The Dodos
 Carrier (board game), a South Pacific World War II board game
 Carrier (TV series), a ten-part documentary miniseries that aired on PBS in April 2008
 Carrier (video game), a 2000 video game for the Sega Dreamcast
 Carriers (film), a 2009 post-apocalyptic horror film
 The Carrier (band), an American melodic hardcore band
 The Carrier, spaceship home to the Authority, a team of comic superheroes

Science
 Carrier is a diluent used to simplify radioanalytical separations.
 Carrier protein, a protein that facilitates the transport of another molecule
 Genetic carrier, an organism that has inherited a genetic trait or mutation
 Asymptomatic carrier, an organism infected with an infectious disease agent

Technology
 Aircraft carrier, a warship primarily hosting fixed-wing aircraft
 Carrier recovery in telecommunications
 Carrier signal, a waveform suitable for modulation by an information-bearing signal
 Helicopter carrier, a warship primarily hosting helicopters
 Universal Carrier, a tracked vehicle
 Wireless carrier, an organization that operates a wireless network for mobile phones
 Information carrier or substrate, the image in a photographic layer

Other
 Carrier, Oklahoma, a town in Garfield County, Oklahoma
 Carrier Global Corporation, air conditioning and commercial refrigeration manufacturing company
 Carrier language, the Athabaskan language of the Dakelh people
 Carrier pigeon, a dove trained to transport messages
 Common carrier, an organization that transports a product or service
 JMA Wireless Dome, formerly known as the Carrier Dome, in Syracuse, New York
 Mail carrier, a postal worker

See also
 Disease carrier (disambiguation) in medicine
 Pet carrier